The London International Student Film Festival is an annual film festival established in 2018 that takes place in central London, which aims to provide a showcase for new filmmakers’ work.

Awards & Prizes
Submission is via FilmFreeway, and shortlisted films compete in a number of categories:
 Best Short Film
 Best Documentary
 Best Animation
 Best Music Video 
 Special Awards

2019
The 2019 London International Student Film Festival took place in London at the Close-Up Film Centre in Shoreditch on Thursday 11 April at 6pm. The Festival director was Mary Houtveld

See also
 BFI London Film Festival
 British Animation Film Festival
 London Independent Film Festival
 London International Animation Festival
 London Short Film Festival

References

External links

Film festivals in London